The discography of Faces, a British rock band, consists of four studio albums, one live album, ten singles, seven compilation albums, and two box sets.

Albums

Studio albums

Live albums

Compilation albums

Singles

References

External links
 Official discography of Faces
 
 

Discographies of British artists
Rock music group discographies